TangataWhenua.com is an indigenous, Māori-run and Māori-operated online news and information site based in Rotorua, Aotearoa New Zealand. The name comes from the phrase Tangata Whenua, "People of the Land".

History
The site's origins are with a fortnightly web-based newsletter called RANGIKAINGA, developed in 2002 by Potaua & Nikolasa Biasiny-Tule while students at Waikato University. The newsletter's content provided relevant news, information and events targeted at a predominantly Māori audience. At the time there were no Māori-focused newsletters of this type.

At the end of the first year the company had a subscriber base of over 1400. The company was incorporated in 2003 and soon after the domain name TangataWhenua.com was officially registered. There are currently over 7000 subscribers.

In 2005, RANGIKAINGA received a commendation from the Human Rights Commission (New Zealand) for its positive contribution to race relations.  In 2006, RANGIKAINGA received an International Standard Serial Number (ISSN) by the National Library of New Zealand - Te Puna Matauranga o Aotearoa, confirming its place as a periodic serial.

Digital projects
In 2007, TangataWhenua.com began facilitating Stage 2 the Google Maori Project, recruiting the help the Māori Language Commission and volunteers to complete the translation of the search interface launched on 23 July 2008, with two Google staff members in attendance.

The website is now one of New Zealand's most popular Māori news and information web portals.

In early 2009, the company began developing digital communication strategies for Maori organisations, including web development projects for the Māori Party, Mana Movement, Te Arawa Group Holdings, Te Arawa River Iwi Trust, Tuhoe Waikaremoana Maori Trust Board—and the National Trust of the Fiji Islands.

Later in the same year, TangataWhenua.com worked with, acclaimed Maori filmmaker, Merata Mita to market and promote the then titled film, The Volcano, by Taika Waititi to Maori audiences online. That movie was later renamed Boy and went on to become the #1 New Zealand film of all time.

In 2011, the company put in a successful bid to Te Mangai Paho, the Maori Broadcasting Funding Agency, for their inaugural Digital Innovation Fund, to design a news reader app for the iPhone. It will be the first ever app developed of this type for a Maori-owned company.

Editorial stance
On domestic matters it is pro-Māori, supporting tino rangatiratanga, indigenous self-determination and development. In the past it has strongly disapproved of mainstream media coverage of Māori issues including the New Zealand foreshore and seabed controversy and the 2007 New Zealand anti-terror raids on Tuhoe.

References

Sources

 Tu Mai (March, 2006). "Technopreneurs, a sign of the times". Tu Mai Publishers, Auckland.

External links
 TangataWhenua.com
 DigitalMaori.com

New Zealand news websites
Māori organisations
Race relations in New Zealand
Internet properties established in 2003
Māori mass media